Suprovat Chakravarty (28 November 1931 – 24 December 2015) was an Indian cyclist. He competed in four events  at the 1952 Summer Olympics.

References

External links
 

1931 births
2015 deaths
Sportspeople from Kolkata
Indian male cyclists
Olympic cyclists of India
Cyclists at the 1952 Summer Olympics